The Valley Engineering Backyard Flyer is an American single-seat ultralight aircraft.

Design and development
The BackYard Flyer is a high wing single-engine conventional landing gear or tricycle gear aircraft. The aircraft was built to comply with FAA part 103 rules for ultralight aircraft. The fuselage is constructed of welded aluminum tubing. The cantilever main wing is capable of rotating 90 degrees for storage without removal from the fuselage. The 40 hp engine uses a Valley Engineering Series Three PSRU. Aircraft are sold with a Ballistic Recovery Systems parachute installation.
After about 20 aircraft were built the production was postponed with plans to restart building in early 2022.

Variants
The Backyard Flyer can be configured as a conventional or tricycle gear aircraft, with a covered or open fuselage.

Specifications (BackYard Flyer)

References

External links
Flight Videos

Homebuilt aircraft
Ultralight aircraft